Homaira Nakhat Dastgirzada (17 May 1960 - 4 September 2020), best known as Nakhat, was a well known Afghan poet. She wrote numerous pieces of Persian literature that were "very lyrical, with a lot of imagery." Dastgirzada was nicknamed the Blue Poet of Afghanistan (شاعر آبی افغانستان)

Biography
Homaira Nakhat Dastgirzada was born at Masturat Hospital in Kabul. Her mother was from Herat, a traditionally popular city of Persian literature. Dastgirzada started writing poems aged twelve, which would later be published in magazines. She would eventually produce literary and artistic programs for Afghan National Radio and Television in 1983. She achieved a doctorate in Persian literature at the University of Sofia, Bulgaria. She played a key role in establishing literary program to students in universities and schools in Kabul, and was a well known public figure.

She married in 1982 and has two children, Hariwa and Hajir. After the hardline Taliban took power in Afghanistan in 1996, Dastgirzada secretely set up a women's poetry club in Kabul. She moved to the Netherlands in 1999, where she settled with her family in the city of Utrecht and co-founded the Association of Afghan Writers and Poets in Exile with other Dutch Afghan artists.

Poetry style
Her poems were written mostly in the form of lyric poetry, specifically Persian ghazal. Although they were deep about pain and sorrow, the main theme remained hope. They were about various topics including social issues, injustice, motherhood, nostalgia of Afghanistan, and new found discoveries in the Netherlands. A number of her works have been translated and published into Dutch.

Many of her works also broke taboos and gave energy to Afghan women and poets.

Death
Dastgirzada died from cancer on 4 September 2020. Four days later, her funeral was held in Utrecht attended by 200 people. Then-President of Afghanistan, Ashraf Ghani, called her death an " irreparable loss to the cultural and literary community."

Published works
Fifteen collections of poetry were published (one posthumously).

A list of selected published works by Dastgirzada:
Blue shatt of liberation برخی از آثار چاپ‌شده او: شط آبی رهایی (1990)
Strange song of exile غزل غریب غربت (2003)
Around fire and regret  به دور آتش و دریغ (2004)
The displaced sun آفتاب آواره  (2009)
Nothing can be said in 50 years هیچ نتوان گفت در ۵۰ سال (2011)
The bright alleys of the Netherlands کوچه های روشن ماه هالند (2011)
Bitter in the fire تلخ در آتش (2012)
White dawn ازسپیده لبریز (2013)
Fantasy butterflies (2014) هستند
Freedom
The city is lonely

References

1960 births
2020 deaths
People from Kabul
20th-century Afghan poets
Afghan emigrants to the Netherlands
Persian-language poets
20th-century Persian-language writers
21st-century Persian-language writers
21st-century Afghan poets